David Johnston (born 28 February 1994) is an Irish rugby union player, currently playing for English side Ealing Trailfinders in the RFU Championship. He plays primarily as a fullback, but can also play at fly-half or centre.

Munster
Johnston made his debut for Munster on 5 September 2015, starting in the opening game of the 2015–16 Pro12 against Benetton. In January 2016, it was announced that Johnston had signed a contract with Munster that will see him join the senior squad from the 2016–17 season, firstly on a development contract and then, from 2017–18, on a full contract. Johnston was nominated for the 2016 Munster Academy Player of the Year Award.

Ealing Trailfinders
English RFU Championship side Ealing Trailfinders announced that Johnston would be joining them on a one-year contract for the 2018–19 season in April 2018. Johnston made 16 appearances for Ealing in his first season with the club, scoring 5 tries.

References

External links
Munster Profile
Pro14 Profile

Living people
1994 births
Rugby union players from County Tipperary
People educated at Rockwell College
Irish rugby union players
UL Bohemians R.F.C. players
Munster Rugby players
Ealing Trailfinders Rugby Club players
Rugby union centres
Rugby union fullbacks
Irish expatriate rugby union players
Expatriate rugby union players in England
Irish expatriate sportspeople in England